In computing, ambient intelligence (AmI) refers to electronic environments that are sensitive and responsive to the presence of people. Ambient intelligence was a projection on the future of consumer electronics, telecommunications and computing that was originally developed in the late 1990s by Eli Zelkha and his team at Palo Alto Ventures for the time frame 2010–2020. Ambient intelligence would allow devices to work in concert to support people in carrying out their everyday life activities, tasks and rituals in an intuitive way using information and intelligence that is hidden in the network connecting these devices (for example: The Internet of Things). As these devices grew smaller, more connected and more integrated into our environment, the technological framework behind them would disappear into our surroundings until only the user interface remains perceivable by users.

The ambient intelligence paradigm builds upon pervasive computing, ubiquitous computing, profiling, context awareness, and human-centric computer interaction design, of which, is characterized by systems and technologies that are:
 embedded: many networked devices are integrated into the environment
 context aware: these devices can recognize you and your situational context
 personalized: they can be tailored to your needs
 adaptive: they can change in response to you
 anticipatory: they can anticipate your desires without conscious mediation.

A typical context of ambient intelligence environment is home, but may also be extended to work spaces (offices, co-working), public spaces (based on technologies such as smart street lights), and hospital environments.

Overview 
The interest in user experience grew in importance in the late 1990s as a result of the increasing volume and importance of digital products and services that were difficult to understand or use. In response, the user experience design emerged to create new technologies and media around the user's personal experience. Ambient intelligence is influenced by user-centered design where the user is placed in the center of the design activity and asked to give feedback through specific user evaluations and tests to improve the design or even co-create the design with the designer (participatory design) or with other users (end-user development).

Ambient intelligence requires a number of key technologies to exist. These include unobtrusive, user-friendly hardware such as miniaturization, nanotechnology, and smart devices, as well as human-centric computer interfaces (intelligent agents, multimodal interaction, context awareness etc.) These systems and devices operate through a seamless mobile/fixed communication and computing infrastructure characterized by interoperability, wired and wireless networks, and service-oriented architecture.

To implement ambient intelligence dynamic and massively distributed device networks, which are easy to control and program (e.g. service discovery, auto-configuration, end-user programmable devices and systems, etc.) These systems and devices must also be dependable and secure, which may be achieved through self-testing and self-repairing software and privacy ensuring technology.

History and invention
In 1998, the board of management of Philips commissioned a series of presentations and internal workshops, organized by Eli Zelkha and Brian Epstein of Palo Alto Ventures. Zelkha, together with Simon Birrell, coined the term 'ambient intelligence' to investigate different scenarios that would transform the high-volume consumer electronic industry of the 1990s, which they described as "fragmented with features", into an industry where user-friendly devices supported ubiquitous information, communication and entertainment by 2020. While developing the ambient intelligence concept, Palo Alto Ventures created the keynote address for Roel Pieper of Philips for the Digital Living Room Conference, 1998. The group included Eli Zelkha, Brian Epstein, Simon Birrell, Doug Randall, and Clark Dodsworth. These plans continued to develop throughout the 1990s, and in 2000, plans were made to construct a feasibility and usability facility dedicated to ambient intelligence. This HomeLab officially opened on 24 April 2002. In 2005, Philips joined the Oxygen alliance, an international consortium of industrial partners within the context of the MIT Oxygen project, aimed at developing technology for the computer of the 21st century.

Along with the development of the vision at Philips, a number of parallel initiatives started to explore ambient intelligence in more detail. Following the advice of the Information Society and Technology Advisory Group (ISTAG), the European Commission used the vision for the launch of their sixth framework (FP6) in Information, Society and Technology (IST), with a subsidiary budget of 3.7 billion euros. The European Commission played a crucial role in the further development of the AmI vision. As a result of many initiatives the AmI vision gained traction. During the past few years several major initiatives have been started. Fraunhofer Society started several activities in a variety of domains including multimedia, microsystems design and augmented spaces. Massachusetts Institute of Technology started an ambient intelligence research group at their Media Lab. Several more research projects started in a variety of countries such as the US, Canada, Spain, France and the Netherlands. Since 2004, the European Symposium on Ambient Intelligence (EUSAI) and many other conferences have been held that address special topics in AmI.

Criticism

As far as dissemination of information on personal presence is out of control, ambient intelligence vision is subject of criticism (e.g. David Wright, Serge Gutwirth, Michael Friedewald et al., Safeguards in a World of Ambient Intelligence, Springer, Dordrecht, 2008). Any immersive, personalized, context-aware and anticipatory characteristics brings up societal, political and cultural concerns about the loss of privacy. The example scenario above shows both the positive and negative possibilities offered by ambient intelligence. Applications of ambient intelligence do not necessarily have to reduce privacy in order to work.

Power concentration in large organizations, a fragmented, decreasingly private society and hyperreal environments where the virtual is indistinguishable from the real are the main topics of critics. Several research groups and communities are investigating the socioeconomic, political and cultural aspects of ambient intelligence.

Social and political aspects
The ISTAG advisory group suggests that the following characteristics will permit the societal acceptance of ambient intelligence. Ambient intelligence should:

 facilitate human contact.
 be oriented towards community and cultural enhancement.
 help to build knowledge and skills for work, better quality of work, citizenship and consumer choice.
 inspire trust and confidence.
 be consistent with long term sustainability—personal, societal and environmental—and with lifelong learning.
 be made easy to live with and controllable by ordinary people.

Business models
The ISTAG group acknowledges the following entry points to AmI business landscape:
 Initial premium value niche markets in industrial, commercial or public applications where enhanced interfaces are needed to support human performance in fast moving or delicate situations.
 Start-up and spin-off opportunities from identifying potential service requirements and putting the services together that meet these new needs.
 High access-low entry cost based on a loss leadership model in order to create economies of scale (mass customization).
 Audience or customer's attention economy as a basis for 'free' end-user services paid for by advertising or complementary services or goods.
 Self-provision—based upon the network economies of very large user communities providing information as a gift or at near zero cost (e.g. social networking applications).
 The combination of multiple and diverse datasets in a platform for sense-making and understanding consumer behaviour (e.g. Near).

Technologies 
A variety of technologies can be used to enable Ambient intelligence environments such as:
 Bluetooth Low Energy
RFID
Microchip implant
 Sensors: Ambient light sensor (photodetector), thermometers, proximity sensors and motion detectors
Software agents
 Affective computing
 Nanotechnology
 Biometrics

Computing 
This means of computing links all pieces of technology together. This also allows the device to have the capability to remember past requests.

Uses in fiction 
 Minority Report (2002 film). One scene illustrates adaptive advertising in the future: consumers are identified via retinal scans, and receive targeted ads.
 The Hitchhiker's Guide to the Galaxy by Douglas Adams. The doors have emotion, and express this when people use them.
 The Diamond Age by Neal Stephenson depicts a world completely changed by the full development of nanotechnology that is present everywhere.
 Her (2013 film). The opening scene depicts the protagonist commuting home, upon arriving the various lights throughout the apartment are turned on as the character moves through the rooms (automated lighting control). A later scene shows that an artificial entity can also control these systems, changing a song being played in the background to lighten a situation, and for humorous effect.

See also 

 Ambient awareness
 Ambient media
 Augmented reality
 Autonomous agent
 Context awareness
 Context-aware pervasive systems
 Cyborg
 Embodied agent
 Friendly artificial intelligence
 Intelligent agent
 Intelligent control
 Internet of Things
 Edge computing
 Mobile computing
 Multi-agent system
 PositiveID
 RFID
 Sensor
 Smart, connected products
 Software agent
 Software bot
 Ubiquitous computing
 Wireless sensor network

References

Bibliography

External links
 SAME Series – Semantic Ambient Media Series Workshop
 STAMI Series – Space, Time and Ambient Intelligence (STAMI). International Workshop Series.
 Sensami – a congress on ambient intelligence.
 AITAmI – Workshop on "Artificial Intelligence Techniques for Ambient Intelligence"
 IJACI – The International Journal of Ambient Computing and Intelligence
 JAISE – The International Journal of Ambient Intelligence and Smart Environments. 
 AISE – Book Series on Ambient Intelligence and Smart Environments.
 I-o-T.org – Internet of Things : mainly based on Ambient intelligence
 AmI – International Joint Conferences on Ambient Intelligent

 
Iranian inventions